Dzmitry Lazouski (born 9 September 1998) is a Belarusian biathlete who represented Belarus at the 2022 Winter Olympics. His first world cup podium finish was in 2022 for the men's 4x7.5 km relay event at Ruhpolding.

References

Living people
1998 births
Belarusian male biathletes
Sportspeople from Minsk
Olympic biathletes of Belarus
Biathletes at the 2022 Winter Olympics